The 1926 Purdue Boilermakers football team was an American football team that represented Purdue University during the 1926 Big Ten Conference football season.  In their fifth season under head coach James Phelan, the Boilermakers compiled a 5–2–1 record, finished in fourth place in the Big Ten Conference with a 2–1–1 record against conference opponents, and outscored opponents by a total of 146 to 67. Tom E. Hogan was the team captain.

Schedule

References

Purdue
Purdue Boilermakers football seasons
Purdue Boilermakers football